Top Gun: Guts and Glory is a modern jet flight simulation that was released in 1993 for the original Nintendo Game Boy in Europe and North America.

Gameplay

This video game is loosely based on the Top Gun film starring Tom Cruise. Essentially controlling a modern U.S. Air Force jet through ten levels, players must take out enemy jet fighters in addition to battleships.

Aircraft that can be chosen are the F-14 Tomcat, the F-117A Nighthawk stealth fighter, the F-16 Fighting Falcon and the Soviet-made MiG-29 Fulcrum. Players can either dedicate themselves to a long career mode, engage in a quick air combat session, or go on a bombing run. Passwords help store the player's progress in career mode.

Due to various limitations found on the original Game Boy system, the player can only see and fight against two enemy aircraft at a time.

Reception
Power Unlimited gave this video game a 40%, they criticized the game commenting: "Sad graphics, little action, poor controllability, and much more. It's all deeply sad." Joypad gave it a rating of 25% overall. Aggregator GameRankings gave the game 51.50%.

See also
 Top Gun (video game)
 Turn and Burn: The F-14 Dogfight Simulator

References

1993 video games
Combat flight simulators
Game Boy games
Game Boy-only games
Konami games
Top Gun video games
Video games based on films
Video games developed in Canada
Distinctive Software games
Single-player video games